Milton James Bennett, often cited as Milton J. Bennett, is an American sociologist.  He is credited as the creator of Developmental Model of Intercultural Sensitivity (DMIS).

Bennett was a tenured professor at Portland State University and is now an adjunct professor of intercultural studies in the Department of Sociology of the University of Milano Bicocca.
He has received prizes from the Society for Intercultural Education, Training and Research (SIETAR) and from NAFSA: Association of International Educators.

Books
 Basic Concepts of Intercultural Communication: Paradigms, Principles, and Practices, Intercultural Press, 2013
 The Handbook of Intercultural Training (ed.), SAGE Publishing, 2004
 American Cultural Patterns: A Cross-Cultural Perspective, co-author with Edward Stewart, Intercultural Press, 1991

References

External link

Living people
American sociologists
University of Minnesota alumni
Stanford University alumni
San Francisco State University alumni
Portland State University faculty
Year of birth missing (living people)
Cultural academics